The 1996 Indian general election in Haryana was held for 10 seats in the state.

List of Elected MPs

Indian general elections in Haryana
1990s in Haryana
1996 Indian general election